Shin Kusakawa (草川 信 (くさかわ しん)) (February 14, 1893, Nagano, Nagano, Japan - September 20, 1948) was a Japanese composer famous for his doyo, "夕やけこやけ (Yūyake koya ke)"/"Sunset Glow."

His eldest son, Hiroshi, was killed in World War II.  He was also a composer, and his works were discovered and performed in 2017.

Partial Discography
 "Sunset" Werner Müller And His Orchestra - Cherry Blossom Time In Japan. Decca Records, 1957
 "Yuyake Koyake" (Evening Glow) on Jean Pierre Rampal, Ensemble Lunaire, Japanese Folk Melodies transcribed by Akio Yashio. CBS Records, 1978.
 Jojou Danshou Akira Kamiya~Seishun no Monologue CQ-7030 (September 1979)
 夕やけこやけ (Yūyake koya ke) "Sunset" Columbia String Orchestra, Yasuo Minami Japanese Favourite Melodies. Denon 35C32-7277, 1984]] 
 Omoide no Douyou Meikyokushuu Mikan no Hanasaku Oka / Masako Kawada 30CC-2190 (March 21, 1988)
 Project A-ko Original Song Book D30G-0080 (October 21, 1988)
 Project A-ko Original Song Book X25X-1009 (October 21, 1988)
 Oriental Green / Eri Kawai DDCZ-1625 (August 26, 2009)
 Shimamura-san and bermei.inazawa: Bokura no Ongaku - Lonesome Life CPNL-0016/OEMM-0202 (December 31, 2019)
 Summer Pockets REFLECTION BLUE Opening Theme: ASTER LORE KSLA-0168 (April 30, 2020)

References

External links
https://vgmdb.net/artist/33556
https://www.discogs.com/artist/1637665-Shin-Kusakawa

1893 births
1948 deaths
20th-century Japanese composers
People from Nagano (city)